Robocopy, for "Robust File Copy", is a command-line directory and/or file replication command for Microsoft Windows. Robocopy functionally replaces Xcopy, with more options. Created by Kevin Allen and first released as part of the Windows NT 4.0 Resource Kit, it has been a standard feature of Windows since Windows Vista and Windows Server 2008.

Features
Robocopy is noted for capabilities above and beyond the built-in Windows copy and xcopy commands, including the following, some requiring appropriate command-line options:
Ability to tolerate network interruptions and resume copy (incomplete files are marked with a date stamp of 1970-01-01 and contain a recovery record so Robocopy knows where to continue from).
Ability to skip NTFS junction points which can cause copying failures because of infinite loops (/XJ)
Ability to copy file data and attributes correctly, and to preserve original timestamps, as well as NTFS ACLs, owner information, and audit information using the /COPYALL or /COPY: command line switches.
Beginning with the XP026 version, the ability to copy folder (or directory) date and timestamps (/DCOPY:T), even with the ability to update folder timestamps (copied from existing folders) on folders already created from previous versions (that did not copy the folder date and timestamps).
Ability to assert the Windows NT "backup right" (/B) so an administrator may copy an entire directory, including files denied readability to the administrator.
Persistence by default, with a programmable number of automatic retries if a file cannot be copied.
A "mirror" mode, which keeps trees synchronised by also deleting files in the destination that are not present in the source.
Ability to skip files already in the destination folder with identical size and timestamp.
A continuously updated command-line progress indicator.
Ability to copy paths exceeding 259 characters — up to a theoretical limit of about 32,000 characters — without errors.
Multithreaded copying introduced with Windows 7 and Windows Server 2008 R2.
Return code on program termination for batch file usage.

Compression
Since Windows Server 2019 and Windows 10, a compression option is available in robocopy when copying across a network. With this switch, if the destination computer supports SMB compression and the files being copied are very compressible, there may be significant improvements to performance. The SMB compression adds inline whitespace compression to file transfers. Compression is also available with the xcopy command and Hyper-V Live Migration with SMB.

Examples of use
Here are some examples of usage, which is not case-sensitive. If more than one option is specified, they must be separated by spaces.

 Copy directory contents of the source  to the destination  (including file data, attributes and timestamps), recursively with empty directories (/E):

Robocopy "C:\Directory A" "C:\Directory B" /E

If directory names have non-standard characters, such as spaces, they must be enclosed in double quotes, as is usual in the command line.

 Copy directory recursively (/E), copy all file information (/COPYALL, equivalent to /COPY:DATSOU, D=Data, A=Attributes, T=Timestamps, S=Security=NTFS ACLs, O=Owner info, U=Auditing info), do not retry locked files (/R:0) (the number of retries on failed copies default value is 1 million), preserve original directories' Timestamps (/DCOPY:T - requires version XP026 or later):

Robocopy C:\A C:\B /COPYALL /E /R:0 /DCOPY:T

 Mirror A to B, destroying any files in B that are not present in A (/MIR), copy files in resume mode (/Z) in case network connection is lost:

Robocopy C:\A \\backupserver\B /MIR /Z

For the full reference, see the Microsoft TechNet Robocopy page.

Syntactic focus on copying folders
Robocopy syntax is markedly different from its predecessors (copy and xcopy), in that it accepts only folder names, without trailing backslash, as its source and destination arguments. File names and wildcard characters (such as * and ?) are not valid as source or destination arguments; files may be selected or excluded using the optional "file" filtering argument (which supports wildcards) along with various other options.

For example, to copy two files from folder  c:\bar to c:\baz,  the following syntax is used:
  robocopy c:\bar c:\baz file1.txt file2.db
And to copy all PDF files from c:\bar to c:\baz:
  robocopy c:\bar c:\baz *.pdf

The files named are copied only from the folder selected for copying; fully qualified path names are not supported.

CAUTION: A long-standing issue with Robocopy means that if you back up from the root folder of a drive [ e.g., ], the destination files will be given attributes including SH. This means that they will be invisible to normal access (including DIR in cmd.exe). To fix this, add  to the robocopy command line - or do an ATTRIB command to remove them afterwards.

Output
Robocopy outputs to the screen, or optionally to a log file, the names of all the directories it encounters, in alphabetical order. Each name is preceded by the number of files in the directory that fulfill the criteria for being copied. If the directory does not yet exist in the target, it is marked "New Dir"; if the directory is empty and the /E option is not used, or it contains no files meeting the criteria, a new directory will not be created.

If the /NFL (no file names in log) option is not used, the files being copied will be listed after the name of the directory they are in.

At the end of the output is a table giving numbers of directories, files, and bytes. For each of these, the table gives the total number found in the source, the number copied (including directories marked "New Dir" even if they are not copied), the number skipped (because they already exist in the target), and the number of mismatches, FAILED, and extras. "Failed" can mean that there was an I/O error that prevented a file being copied, or that access was denied. There is also a row of time taken (in which the time spent on failed files seems to be in the wrong column).

Bandwidth throttling
Robocopy's "inter-packet gap" (IPG) option allows some control over the network bandwidth used in a session. In theory, the following formula expresses the delay (in milliseconds) required to simulate a desired bandwidth (BD, in kilobits per second), over a network link with an available bandwidth of BA kbps:

In practice however, some experimentation is usually required to find a suitable delay, due to factors such as the nature and volume of other traffic on the network. The methodology employed by the IPG option may not offer the same level of control provided by some other bandwidth throttling technologies, such as BITS (which is used by Windows Update and BranchCache).

Limitations
 Robocopy does not copy open files. Any process may open files for exclusive read access by withholding the FILE_SHARE_READ flag during opening. Even Robocopy's Backup mode will not touch those files. (Backup mode instead runs Robocopy as a "Backup Operator". This allows Robocopy to override permissions settings, specifically, NTFS ACLs). Normally Volume Shadow Copy Service is used for such situations, but Robocopy does not use it. Consequently, Robocopy is not suitable for backing up live operating system volumes.

 Robocopy versions on systems older than Windows Vista do not mirror properly. They ignore changed security attributes of previously mirrored files.
 When specifying the /MT[:n] option to enable multithreaded copying, the /NP option to disable reporting of the progress percentage for files is ignored. By default the MT switch provides 8 threads. The n is the number of threads you specify if you do not want to use the default.

GUI
Although Robocopy itself is a command-line tool, Microsoft TechNet provided a GUI front-end called Robocopy GUI. It was developed by Derk Benisch, a systems engineer with the MSN Search group at Microsoft, and required .NET Framework 2.0. It included a copy of Robocopy version XP026. It is no longer available from Microsoft, but may be downloaded from the Internet Archive's Wayback Machine.

There are non-Microsoft GUIs for Robocopy:
 Cinchoo's ChoEazyCopy, Simple and powerful RoboCopy GUI v2.0.0.1 (March 11, 2022)
 "Easy RoboCopy", latest version 1.0.16 released on January 11, 2022.
 "WinRoboCopy" revision 1.3.5953.40896 released on April 19, 2016.
 RoboCop RoboCopy, Robocopy GUI Skin and script generator with Progress Monitoring, 10 September 2015.
 A program by SH-Soft, also called "Robocopy GUI" v1.0.0.24 (October 8, 2005).

Ken Tamaru of Microsoft developed a copying program with functionality similar to Robocopy, called RichCopy, discontinued in 2010. It is not based on Robocopy, and does not require .NET Framework.

Versions
Several versions of Robocopy do not report the version number when executing robocopy /? on the command line. However, their version is stored inside the executable itself and can be queried with PowerShell for example (gcm robocopy | fl *) or inside Windows Explorer by right-clicking on Robocopy.exe, selecting Properties, then clicking on the Details tab.

See also
 List of file copying software
 Command line
 List of DOS commands
 rsync
 GUI
 SyncToy
 Ultracopier

References

External links

 Official sources
 Microsoft Robocopy documentation
Robocopy download (Version XP010) as part of Windows Server 2003 Resource Kit Tools. Includes 35-page documentation "robocopy.doc".
Robocopy short documentation on Microsoft TechNet Library
Robocopy GUI download (Version 3.1.2.0) on Microsoft TechNet Magazine
 Other
ROBOCOPY.exe (XP Resource Kit/Standard Vista command)

File copy utilities